Hayden Andrew Penn (born October 13, 1984) is an American former professional baseball player. He played as a right-handed pitcher in Major League Baseball (MLB) and in the Nippon Professional Baseball (NPB).

Career

Baltimore Orioles
Born in Santee, California, Penn was drafted by the Baltimore Orioles in the 5th round of the 2002 Major League Baseball Draft. At the time of his callup Penn was the youngest player in the Major Leagues (20 yrs, 7 months).

In May , he suffered appendicitis after being called up by the Orioles and missed several months while recovering from it. He went 7–4 with an ERA of 2.26 through 14 starts for the Class AAA Ottawa Lynx in 2006 and was called up to Baltimore again when the major league rosters expanded on September 1. He made his first start of the season for Baltimore on September 3 against the Oakland Athletics; he gave up eight runs in two-thirds of an inning, for an ERA of 108.00, and took the loss.

Florida Marlins
Penn was traded to the Florida Marlins on April 1, 2009 in exchange for infielder Robert Andino.

After a bad outing on June 3, 2009, the Marlins designated Penn for assignment. He cleared waivers and was assigned to the AAA New Orleans Zephyrs. On November 9, the Marlins purchased his contract from the AAA New Orleans Zephyrs and added him to the 40-man roster.

Pittsburgh Pirates
Penn was waived by the Marlins during the 2010 Spring Training and claimed by the Pittsburgh Pirates,  making their opening day roster. He was designated for assignment on April 12, 2010 after giving up 8 runs in 2.1 innings pitched over 3 games, accepting an assignment to Triple-A Indianapolis.

Chiba Lotte Marines
Penn's contract was sold to the Chiba Lotte Marines during the 2010 season. He helped the Marines win the 2010 Nippon World Series, starting and winning game 5 of the series. He did not pitch in 2011 due to elbow surgery.

Bridgeport Bluefish
Penn played for the Bridgeport Bluefish of the Atlantic League of Professional Baseball in 2013.

References

External links

1984 births
Living people
American expatriate baseball players in Canada
American expatriate baseball players in Japan
Aberdeen IronBirds players
Baltimore Orioles players
Baseball players from San Diego
Bridgeport Bluefish players
Chiba Lotte Marines players
Florida Marlins players
Major League Baseball pitchers
New Orleans Zephyrs players
Norfolk Tides players
Ottawa Lynx players
People from Santee, California
Pittsburgh Pirates players
Bowie Baysox players
Delmarva Shorebirds players
Frederick Keys players
Gulf Coast Orioles players
Indianapolis Indians players
Phoenix Desert Dogs players